State Route 130 (SR 130) is a  state highway in Pike and Barbour counties in the southeastern part of the U.S. state of Alabama. The western terminus of the highway is at an intersection with U.S. Route 29 (US 29) east of Banks. The eastern terminus of the highway is at an intersection with SR 51 in Louisville.

Route description

SR 130 begins at an intersection with US 29 (internally designated as SR 15) east of Banks. It travels southeast, south, and then east towards Louisville. The highway then ends at SR 51 in Louisville.

Major intersections

See also

References

External links

130
Transportation in Pike County, Alabama
Transportation in Barbour County, Alabama